The 1951–52 NBA season was the sixth season of the National Basketball Association. The season ended with the Minneapolis Lakers winning the NBA Championship, beating the New York Knicks 4 games to 3 in the NBA Finals.

Notable occurrences 
 The Tri-Cities Blackhawks relocated from the "Tri-Cities" area (Moline, Illinois, Rock Island, Illinois & Davenport, Iowa) to Milwaukee, Wisconsin and became the Milwaukee Hawks.
 The 1952 NBA All-Star Game was played in Boston, Massachusetts, with the East beating the West 108–91. Paul Arizin of the Philadelphia Warriors won the game's MVP award.

Final standings

Eastern Division

Western Division

x – Clinched playoff spot

Playoffs

Statistics leaders

Note: Prior to the 1969–70 season, league leaders in points, rebounds, and assists were determined by totals rather than averages.

NBA awards

All-NBA First Team:
Paul Arizin, Philadelphia Warriors
Bob Cousy, Boston Celtics
Ed Macauley, Boston Celtics
Bob Davies, Rochester Royals
Dolph Schayes, Syracuse Nationals
George Mikan, Minneapolis Lakers

All-NBA Second Team:
Larry Foust, Fort Wayne Pistons
Vern Mikkelsen, Minneapolis Lakers
Andy Phillip, Philadelphia Warriors
Jim Pollard, Minneapolis Lakers
Bobby Wanzer, Rochester Royals

References